Pandit Raghunath Prasanna (1913 – June 1999) was an Indian classical shehnai and flute player. He was known for using the techniques of shehnai in flute playing, also inspired by vocal music.

Personal life and family
Raghunath was born in 1913 in Varanasi in the state of Uttar Pradesh.

He was married to Saraswati Devi. They had seven children. One of them is the flute and shehnai player Rajendra Prasanna, whose son Rishab, Rajesh and Ritesh play the bansuri.

Career
Raghunath Prasanna got his musical training from his father Gauri Shanker, a shehnai player, and from Dauji Mishra from Varanasi. He was the first person in the family to introduce the art of flute (tripura bansuri and Krishna bansuri) in the family tradition, known until then for shehnai playing.

At an early age, Prasanna worked as a Staff Artiste at various All India Radio stations, including Lucknow, Allahabad and Ranchi. Afterwards, he attended Banaras Hindu University and eventually received a seat in the Song and Drama Division of the Government of India.

Raghunath was also known for playing Tripura and Krishna bansuris.

His techniques have been adopted by his younger brothers and disciples Vishnu and Bholanath Prasannas, his sons Rakesh and Rajendra Prasannas, Niranjan Prasad, and Bhanu and Ronu Majumdars.

Alain Daniélou has recorded his shehnai and tripura bansuri on the album Anthology of Indian Classical Music in 1955.

Prasanna received the Sangeet Natak Academi Award (1996).

References

External links

1913 births
1999 deaths
Indian male classical musicians
Musicians from Varanasi
Bansuri players
Shehnai players
Banaras Hindu University alumni
Recipients of the Sangeet Natak Akademi Award
Indian flautists
20th-century Indian male classical singers
20th-century flautists